Blukat Rural District is a rural district (dehestan) in Rahmatabad and Blukat District, Rudbar County, Gilan Province, Iran. At the 2006 census, its population was 5,710, in 1,430 families. The rural district has 19 villages.

References 

Rural Districts of Gilan Province
Rudbar County